Aikwood Tower (formerly known as Oakwood Tower) is a 16th-century tower house in the Scottish Borders area of Scotland,  southwest of the town of Selkirk, on the Ettrick Water. It has been restored and renovated to offer luxury self-catering holidays and weddings. Viewings and tours by appointment only. 

The tower is a Category A listed building.

The tower was built in 1535, but in the late 18th century it was abandoned as a dwelling and was used as a store on the adjoining farm. The building was restored in the early 1990s by the former Liberal Party leader David Steel. He and his wife lived there for twenty years from 1992 to 2012. Aikwood Tower is now owned by Steel's son Rory and his wife who operate it as a private holiday home and wedding venue.

See also
List of places in the Scottish Borders
List of castles in Scotland

References

Gazetteer for Scotland, Aikwood Tower

External links
SCRAN: black-and-white image; listed as "Oakwood Tower"
SCRAN: colour image of Aikwood tower
Restoration of Aikwood Tower by Sir David Steel
Federation of Scottish Theatre: Rowan Tree Theatre company, based at Aikwood Tower

Castles in the Scottish Borders
Category A listed buildings in the Scottish Borders
Listed castles in Scotland
Tourist attractions in the Scottish Borders
Houses completed in 1535
1535 establishments in Scotland